Gold Experience (stylized in all caps) is the fifth full-length studio album from the Japanese idol group Idoling!!!. It 
reached number 3 on the Oricon Weekly Chart.

Contents
Gold Experience was released in three types:
 Limited A-type Edition (CD and DVD)
 Limited B-type Edition (CD and Blu-ray)
 Normal Edition (CD)

The Limited A cover features #3 Mai Endo, #12 Yui Kawamura, #14 Sakai Hitomi, #15 Nao Asahi, #17 Hitomi Miyake, #20 Ai Okawa, #23 Yuna Ito, #26 Chika Ojima, #27 Kurumi Takahashi, #30 Reia Kiyoku, #31 Mayu Furuhashi, #32 Mayu Sekiya, #33 Ruka Hashimoto.

The Limited B cover features  #6 Erica Tonooka, #9 Rurika Yokoyama, #13 Serina Nagano, #16 Ami Kikuchi, #19 Yurika Tachibana, #21 Kaede Hashimoto, #22 Ruka Kurata, #25 Kaoru Goto, #28 Karen Ishida, #29 Ramu Tamagawa, #34 Rena Sato, #35 Michaela Wako Sato.

Track listing

All edition

CD

Blu-ray & DVD 
 Don't think. Feel !!! -Music Video-
 MAMORE!!! -Music Video-
 One Up!!! -Music Video-
 Ichigo Gyūnyū -Music Video-
 Sakura Thank You -Music Video-

Notes
 The first album featuring 5th and Neo(6th) Generation members.
 Kaniko is performed by KANI SEVEN (#12 Kawamura, #13 Nagano, #17 Miyake, #22 Kurata, #26 Ojima, #30 Kiyoku, #32 Sekiya).
 Sentō Renai Shōjo Robo B-gata no Yūutsu is performed by B-gataΩIdoling!!! (#13 Nagano, #15 Asahi, #16 Kikuchi, #25 Goto, #26 Ojima).
 Bon Voyage! is performed by U-17ing!!! (#21 K.Hashimoto, #22 Kurata, #27 Takahashi, #28 Ishida, #29 Tamagawa, #30 Kiyoku, #31 Furuhashi, #33 R.Hashimoto, #34 R.Sato, #35 M.Sato).
 Natsu no Ojousan is performed by PEACE!Idoling!!! (#3 Endo, #6 Tonooka, #9 Yokoyama, #12 Kawamura, #13 Nagano, #14 Sakai, #15 Asahi, #16 Kikuchi, #17 Miyake, #19 Tachibana, #20 Okawa, #26 Ojima). The song is a cover song originally performed by Sakakibara Ikue.
 Namida no Freesia is performed by Nakimushi!?Idoling!!! (#15 Asahi, #16 Kikuchi, #20 Okawa, #29 Tamagawa).
 Samui Yoru Dakara... is a cover song originally performed by TRF. The song was used as Fuji TV Winter Fest 2014 image song.
 Puri♥Kyun Survival is performed by Idoling NEO (#23 Ito, #25 Goto, #31 Furuhashi, #32 Sekiya, #33 R.Hashimoto, #34 R.Sato, #35 M.Sato).
 Promise is performed by Shittori♮Idoling!!! (#3 Endo, #6 Tonooka, #9 Yokoyama, #17 Miyake, #19 Tachibana, #23 Ito, #31 Furuhashi, #32 Sekiya).

References

External links 
 Normal Edition GOLD EXPERIENCE on iTunes Japan
 Idoling!!! official site - Fuji TV

Idoling!!! albums
Pony Canyon albums
2014 albums